P. J. Gallagher may refer to:

 P. J. Gallagher (boxer) (born 1974), British boxer
 P. J. Gallagher (comedian), Irish stand-up comedian
 P. J. Gallagher (politician), American politician in the state of Washington

See also
Gallagher (surname)